Timothy Dimock (April 17, 1799 – April 29, 1874) was an American physician and politician who was the father or prominent lawyer and businessman Henry F. Dimock.

Early life and career
Dimock was born on April 17, 1799 in Coventry, Connecticut, to Daniel Dimick (1765-1833) and Anna Wright (1766-1832). He had eight siblings. Dimock graduated from Yale Medical School in 1823.

He practiced medicine in Coventry since taking his degree. In 1846, he was a member of the Connecticut State Senate, and ex officio one of the Corporation of Yale College.

He was a member of the Connecticut House of Representatives in 1838 and the Senate in 1846. During the 1850s and 1860s, he served as surgeon for parts of Connecticut's militia, empowered to grant medical waivers for exemption of duty.

Personal life
On June 29, 1826, Dimock married Mary Ann Moody (1810–1838). Together they had a daughter.

After Moody's death in 1838, he married Laura Farnam Booth (1819-1872) on May 8, 1839. Together they had:
Mary Elizabeth Dimock (1840-1842)
Henry F. Dimock (1842–1911), who married Susan Collins Whitney, daughter of James Scollay Whitney (1811-1878) of the prominent Whitney family
Maria Farnam Dimock (1843-1861)
He died in South Coventry, Conn., April 29, 1874 and is buried at the Nathan Hale Cemetery in Coventry, Connecticut.

Honors
The Booth & Dimock Memorial Library in Coventry is named for him and Reverend Chauncey Booth. His son, Henry, who died on April 10, 1911, left $40,000 to the South Coventry Library Association to build the Booth and Dimock Memorial Library, named for his father and grandfather.

References

External links

1799 births
1874 deaths
Yale School of Medicine alumni
Connecticut state senators
Physicians from Connecticut
19th-century American politicians